Eurhodope monogrammos is a species of snout moth in the genus Eurhodope. It was described by Zeller in 1867. It is found in Bulgaria, Albania and Turkey.

References

Moths described in 1867
Phycitini
Moths of Europe
Moths of Asia